Belenois anomala is a butterfly in the family Pieridae. It is found on Socotra.

References

Seitz, A. Die Gross-Schmetterlinge der Erde 13: Die Afrikanischen Tagfalter. Plate XIII 15

Butterflies described in 1881
Pierini
Endemic fauna of Socotra
Taxa named by Arthur Gardiner Butler